The ACM SIGPLAN International Conference on Functional Programming (ICFP) is an annual academic conference in the field of computer science sponsored by the ACM SIGPLAN, in association with IFIP Working Group 2.8 (Functional Programming). The conference focuses on functional programming and related areas of programming languages, logic, compilers and software development.

The ICFP was first held in 1996, replacing two biennial conferences: Functional Programming and Computer Architecture (FPCA) and LISP and Functional Programming (LFP). The conference location alternates between Europe (odd-numbered years) and North America (even-numbered years). The conference usually lasts 3 days, surrounded by co-located workshops devoted to particular functional languages or application areas.

The ICFP has also held an open annual programming contest since 1998, called the ICFP Programming Contest.

History 
 2012: 17th ACM SIGPLAN International Conference on Functional Programming in Copenhagen, Denmark (General Chair: Peter Thiemann, University of Freiburg; Program Chair: Robby Findler, Northwestern University)

Affiliated events 
 Commercial Users of Functional Programming (CUFP)
 Erlang Workshop
 Haskell Symposium
 Functional and Declarative Programming in Education (FDPE)
 Functional Programming Developer Tracks (DEFUN)
 MEchanized Reasoning about Languages with varIable biNding (MERLIN)
 Workshop on Approaches and Applications of Inductive Programming 
 Workshop on Curry and Functional Logic Programming
 Workshop on Generic Programming (WGP)
 Workshop on Mechanizing Metatheory (WMM)
 Workshop on ML
 Workshop on Scheme and Functional Programming
 Programming Languages meets Program Verification (PLPV) — 2007 only, now affiliated with POPL

See also 
 Related conferences
 FLOPS: International Symposium on Functional and Logic Programming
 IFL: International Symposia on Implementation and Application of Functional Languages
 ISMM: International Symposium on Memory Management
 MPC: International Conference on Mathematics of Program Construction
 PLDI: Programming Language Design and Implementation
 POPL: Principles of Programming Languages
 PPDP: International Conference on Principles and Practice of Declarative Programming
 TFP: Symposium on Trends in Functional Programming
 TLCA: International Conference on Typed Lambda Calculi and Applications
 TLDI: International Workshop on Types in Language Design and Implementation
 SAS: International Static Analysis Symposium
 Related journals
 Journal of Functional Programming
 Journal of Functional and Logic Programming
 Higher-Order and Symbolic Computation
 ACM Transactions on Programming Languages and Systems

External links
 ICFP main site
 ICFP 2008 conference
 ICFP 2007 conference
 ICFP 2006 conference
 ICFP Programming Contest
 Functional Programming conference 

Computer science conferences
Functional programming
Programming languages conferences